Nate Robinson (born May 4, 1990 in Novi, Michigan) is an American soccer player.

Career
While playing with the Detroit Titans, Robinson scored 6 goals and got 16 assist.

Professional

Colorado Springs Switchbacks FC 
On February 6, 2015 Robinson signed with the Colorado Springs Switchbacks FC for the 2015 USL Pro Season.

On January 27, 2016 Robinson resigned with the Colorado Springs Switchbacks FC for the 2016 USL Pro Season.  On February 28, 2016 Robinson scored in a 2–1 win for the Colorado Springs Switchbacks FC against the Air Force Academy. On March 9, 2016 Robinson scored in a 2–0 win for the  Colorado Springs Switchbacks FC against the Colorado School of Minds. On March 15, 2016 Robinson scored in a 4-0 preseason victory against Ventura County Fusion.

References

External links 
 Richmond Kickers Profile.

1990 births
Living people
American soccer players
Cincinnati Bearcats men's soccer players
Flint City Bucks players
Richmond Kickers players
Colorado Springs Switchbacks FC players
Association football midfielders
Soccer players from Michigan
USL League Two players
USL Championship players
People from Novi, Michigan